Zygocera metallica is a species of beetle in the family Cerambycidae. It was described by John O. Westwood in 1863. It is known from Australia.

References

Zygocerini
Beetles described in 1863